Twin Cairns is a mountain located southeast of Simpson Pass and southwest of Banff Sunshine, along the Continental Divide which separates British Columbia and Alberta in the Rocky Mountains of western Canada.

References

Two-thousanders of British Columbia
Canadian Rockies
Kootenay Land District